is a trust bank in Japan. It was founded in 2000 and claims to be the first trust bank in Japan to be exclusively engaged in asset administration business. 

The company's shareholders are Mitsubishi UFJ Trust and Banking Corporation (46.5%), Nippon Life Insurance (33.5%), Meiji Yasuda Life Insurance (10%) and Norinchukin Trust & Banking Co. (10%). Master Trust Bank is treated as a consolidated subsidiary of Mitsubishi UFJ Trust and Banking, and is by extension part of the Mitsubishi UFJ Financial Group.

It is one of the three main master trust service providers in Japan, alongside Trust & Custody Services Bank (affiliated with Mizuho) and Japan Trustee Services Bank (affiliated with SMFG).

History 
Master Trust Bank was founded in 2000 with investments from Mitsubishi Trust Bank, Nippon Life Insurance, Toyo Trust Bank, Meiji Life Insurance and Deutsche Bank. A month after its founding, it became the first Japanese asset administrator to offer online information reporting services.

References

External links
The Master Trust Bank of Japan, Ltd. (in Japanese)

Financial services companies based in Tokyo
Mitsubishi UFJ Financial Group
Banks established in 1985
Trust banks of Japan
Meiji Yasuda Life
Nippon Life
Japanese companies established in 1985